Akoya condominiums is a 47-story, high-rise residential condominium located in Miami Beach, Florida. Built in 2004 and rising 150 meters (492 feet), Akoya Condominiums is the third tallest building in Miami Beach, after the 170 meter Blue and Green Diamonds.  It was built as one of the last very tall buildings permitted in Miami Beach before a 1998 height ordinance, capping buildings at 200 feet, went into effect.

The Akoya condominiums were originally planned to be the White Diamond. Akoya has more floors than the Blue and Green Diamond buildings but does not have the diamond-shaped roof that they have. The original developer of the projects, Brazilian businessman Múcio Athayde, was forced to sell the White Diamond project in 2001 due to financial stresses that later put the other two buildings into bankruptcy. The project was completed by the MerCo Group, controlled by developer Homero Meruelo, which later also bought the nearby Deauville Hotel. The name "Akoya" is originally Japanese (阿古屋) and refers to the Akoya pearl oyster, which was chosen to replace the diamond theme.

Akoya condominiums is located along the beach of the Atlantic Ocean on Collins Avenue. Akoya condominiums has 528 units, with 11 units per floor which translates to 48 floors. A modern fitness center, a tennis court, a swimming pool and racquetball facilities are available exclusively for Akoya's residents.

See also
List of tallest buildings in Miami Beach

References

Residential skyscrapers in Miami Beach, Florida
Residential buildings completed in 2004
2004 establishments in Florida